The medieval renaissances were periods characterised by significant cultural renewal across medieval Western Europe. These are effectively seen as occurring in three phases - the Carolingian Renaissance (8th and 9th centuries), Ottonian Renaissance (10th century) and the Renaissance of the 12th century.

The term was first used by medievalists in the 19th century, by analogy with the historiographical concept of the 15th and 16th century Italian Renaissance. This was notable since it marked a break with the dominant historiography of the time, which saw the Middle Ages as a Dark Age. The term has always been a subject of debate and criticism, particularly on how widespread such renewal movements were and on the validity of comparing them with the Italian Renaissance.

History of the concept 

The term 'renaissance' was first used as a name for a period in medieval history in the 1830s, with the birth of medieval studies. It was coined by Jean-Jacques Ampère.

Pre-Carolingian renaissances
As Pierre Riché points out, the expression "Carolingian Renaissance" does not imply that Western Europe was barbaric or obscurantist before the Carolingian era. The centuries following the collapse of the Roman Empire in the West did not see an abrupt disappearance of the ancient schools, from which emerged Martianus Capella, Cassiodorus and Boethius, essential icons of the Roman cultural heritage in the Middle Ages, thanks to which the disciplines of liberal arts were preserved. The fall of the Western Roman Empire saw the "Vandal Renaissance" of Kings Thrasamund and Hilderic in late 5th and early 6th century North Africa, where ambitious architectural projects were commissioned, the Vandal kings dressed in Roman imperial style with Roman triumphal rulership symbols, and intellectual traditions, poetry and literature flourished. The 7th century saw the "Isidorian Renaissance" in the Visigothic Kingdom of Hispania in which sciences flourished and the integration of Christian and pre-Christian thought occurred, while the spread of Irish monastic schools (scriptoria) over Europe laid the groundwork for the Carolingian Renaissance. There was a similar flourishing in the Northumbrian Renaissance of the 7th and 8th centuries.

Carolingian renaissance (8th and 9th centuries) 

The Carolingian Renaissance was a period of intellectual and cultural revival in the Carolingian Empire occurring from the late eighth century to the ninth century, as the first of three medieval renaissances. It occurred mostly during the reigns of the Carolingian rulers Charlemagne and Louis the Pious. It was supported by the scholars of the Carolingian court, notably Alcuin of York For moral betterment the Carolingian renaissance reached for models drawn from the example of the Christian Roman Empire of the 4th century. During this period there was an increase of literature, writing, the arts, architecture, jurisprudence, liturgical reforms and scriptural studies. Charlemagne's Admonitio generalis (789) and his Epistola de litteris colendis served as manifestos. The effects of this cultural revival, however, were largely limited to a small group of court literati: "it had a spectacular effect on education and culture in Francia, a debatable effect on artistic endeavors, and an immeasurable effect on what mattered most to the Carolingians, the moral regeneration of society," John Contreni observes. Beyond their efforts to write better Latin, to copy and preserve patristic and classical texts and to develop a more legible, classicizing script—the Carolingian minuscule that Renaissance humanists took to be Roman and employed as humanist minuscule, from which has developed early modern Italic script—the secular and ecclesiastical leaders of the Carolingian Renaissance for the first time in centuries applied rational ideas to social issues, providing a common language and writing style that allowed for communication across most of Europe.

One of the primary efforts was the creation of a standardized curriculum for use at the recently created schools. Alcuin led this effort and was responsible for the writing of textbooks, creation of word lists, and establishing the trivium and quadrivium as the basis for education.

Art historian Kenneth Clark was of the view that by means of the Carolingian Renaissance, Western civilization survived by the skin of its teeth. The use of the term renaissance to describe this period is contested due to the majority of changes brought about by this period being confined almost entirely to the clergy, and due to the period lacking the wide-ranging social movements of the later Italian Renaissance. Instead of being a rebirth of new cultural movements, the period was more an attempt to recreate the previous culture of the Roman Empire. The Carolingian Renaissance in retrospect also has some of the character of a false dawn, in that its cultural gains were largely dissipated within a couple of generations, a perception voiced by Walahfrid Strabo (died 849), in his introduction to Einhard's Life of Charlemagne.

Similar processes occurred in Southeast Europe with the Christianization of Bulgaria and the introduction liturgy in Old Bulgarian language and the Cyrillic script created in Bulgaria few years before the reign of Simeon I of Bulgaria, during the reign of his father Boris I of Bulgaria. Clement of Ohrid and Naum of Preslav created (or rather compiled) the new alphabet which was called Cyrillic and was declared the official alphabet in Bulgaria in 893. The Old Church Slavonic language was declared as official in the same year. In the following centuries the liturgy in Bulgarian language and the alphabet were adopted by many other Slavic peoples and counties. The Golden Age of medieval Bulgarian culture is the period of the Bulgarian cultural prosperity during the reign of emperor Simeon I the Great (889—927). The term was coined by Spiridon Palauzov in the mid 19th century. During this period there was an increase of literature, writing, arts, architecture and liturgical reforms.

Ottonian renaissance (10th and 11th centuries)

The Ottonian Renaissance was a limited renaissance of logic, science, economy and art in central and southern Europe that accompanied the reigns of the first three emperors of the Saxon Dynasty, all named Otto: Otto I (936–973), Otto II (973–983), and Otto III (983–1002), and which in large part depended upon their patronage. Pope Sylvester II and Abbo of Fleury were leading figures in this movement. The Ottonian Renaissance began after Otto's marriage to Adelaide (951) united the kingdoms of Italy and Germany and thus brought the West closer to Byzantium and furthered the cause of Christian (political) unity   with his imperial coronation in 963.  The period is sometimes extended to cover the reign of Henry II as well, and, rarely, the Salian dynasts. The term is generally confined to Imperial court culture conducted in Latin in Germany. It is sometimes also known as the Renaissance of the 10th century, so as to include developments outside Germania, or as the Year 1000 Renewal, due to coming right at the end of the 10th century. It was shorter than the preceding Carolingian Renaissance and to a large extent a continuation of it - this has led historians such as Pierre Riché to prefer evoking it as a 'third Carolingian renaissance', covering the 10th century and running over into the 11th century, with the 'first Carolingian renaissance' occurring during Charlemagne's own reign and the 'second Carolingian renaissance' happening under his successors.

The Ottonian Renaissance is recognized especially in the arts and architecture, invigorated by renewed contact with Constantinople, in some revived cathedral schools, such as that of Bruno of Cologne, in the production of illuminated manuscripts from a handful of elite scriptoria, such as Quedlinburg, founded by Otto in 936, and in political ideology. The Imperial court became the center of religious and spiritual life, led by the example of women of the royal family: Matilda the literate mother of Otto I, or his sister Gerberga of Saxony, or his consort Adelaide, or Empress Theophanu.

12th-century Renaissance

The Renaissance of the 12th century was a period of many changes at the outset of the High Middle Ages. It included social, political and economic transformations, and an intellectual revitalization of Western Europe with strong philosophical and scientific roots. For some historians these changes paved the way to later achievements such as the literary and artistic movement of the Italian Renaissance in the 15th century and the scientific developments of the 17th century.

After the collapse of the Western Roman Empire, Western Europe had entered the Middle Ages with great difficulties. Apart from depopulation and other factors, most classical scientific treatises of classical antiquity, written in Greek, had become unavailable. Philosophical and scientific teaching of the Early Middle Ages was based upon the few Latin translations and commentaries on ancient Greek scientific and philosophical texts that remained in the Latin West.

This scenario changed during the renaissance of the 12th century. The increased contact with the Islamic world in Spain and Sicily, the Crusades, the Reconquista, as well as increased contact with Byzantium, allowed Europeans to seek and translate the works of Hellenic and Islamic philosophers and scientists, especially the works of Aristotle.

The development of medieval universities allowed them to aid materially in the translation and propagation of these texts and started a new infrastructure which was needed for scientific communities. In fact, the European university put many of these texts at the center of its curriculum, with the result that the "medieval university laid far greater emphasis on science than does its modern counterpart and descendent."

In Northern Europe, the Hanseatic League was founded in the 12th century, with the foundation of the city of Lübeck in 1158–1159. Many northern cities of the Holy Roman Empire became Hanseatic cities, including Hamburg, Stettin, Bremen and Rostock. Hanseatic cities outside the Holy Roman Empire were, for instance, Bruges, London and the Polish city of Danzig (Gdańsk). In Bergen and Novgorod the league had factories and middlemen. In this period the Germans started colonizing Eastern Europe beyond the Empire, into Prussia and Silesia. In the late 13th century Westerners became more aware of the Far East.  Marco Polo is the most commonly known documenter due to his popular book Il Milione but he was neither the first nor the only traveller on the Silk Road to China.
Several Christian missionaries such as William of Rubruck, Giovanni da Pian del Carpini, Andrew of Longjumeau, Odoric of Pordenone, Giovanni de Marignolli, Giovanni di Monte Corvino, and other travelers such as Niccolò da Conti also contributed to the knowledge and interest in the far eastern lands.
The translation of texts from other cultures, especially ancient Greek works, was an important aspect of both this Twelfth-Century Renaissance and the latter Renaissance (of the 15th century), the relevant difference being that Latin scholars of this earlier period focused almost entirely on translating and studying Greek and Arabic works of natural science, philosophy and mathematics, while the latter Renaissance focus was on literary and historical texts.

A new method of learning called scholasticism developed in the late 12th century from the rediscovery of the works of Aristotle; the works of medieval Jewish and Islamic thinkers influenced by him, notably Maimonides, Avicenna (see Avicennism) and Averroes (see Averroism); and the Christian philosophers influenced by them, most notably Albertus Magnus, Bonaventure and Abélard. Those who practiced the scholastic method believed in empiricism and supporting Roman Catholic doctrines through secular study, reason, and logic. Other notable scholastics ("schoolmen") included Roscelin and Peter Lombard. One of the main questions during this time was the problem of the universals. Prominent non-scholastics of the time included Anselm of Canterbury, Peter Damian, Bernard of Clairvaux, and the Victorines. The most famous of the scholastic practitioners was Thomas Aquinas (later declared a Doctor of the Church), who led the move away from the Platonic and Augustinian and towards the Aristotelian.

During the High Middle Ages in Europe, there was increased innovation in means of production, leading to economic growth. These innovations included the windmill, manufacturing of paper, the spinning wheel, the magnetic compass, eyeglasses, the astrolabe, and Hindu-Arabic numerals.

See also
 Continuity thesis
 Golden Age of medieval Bulgarian culture
 Tarnovo Literary School
 Art School of Tarnovo
 Painting of the Tarnovo Artistic School
 Architecture of the Tarnovo Artistic School

References

Medieval culture
Medieval studies
Christendom